A Toast to Melba is a 1976 Australian play by Jack Hibberd. A biography of Dame Nellie Melba, Hibberd described it as:
Another 'Popular Play' like The Les Darcy Show. Using the Epic Theatre techniques of Bertolt Brecht (without politics), the play encompasses the life of diva Nellie Melba from childhood in Melbourne to her death in Egypt (alleged dying words: "I never did like Aida.")... The actress who plays Melba must be able to sing a few arias and parlour songs. There is a selection of recorded music that is essential to the work.
The play is one of Hibberd's personal favourites.

1980 TV adaptation

The play was adapted with Robyn Nevin in the title role by the ABC in 1980 as part of the Australian Theatre Festival.

Alan Burke's direction won him a Sammy Award. The production was much praised and was sold abroad.

References

External links

1980 TV Version at Screen Australia

1976 plays
Australian plays
Australian television plays
1980 television films
1980 films
Australian films based on plays
Biographical plays about musicians
1980s English-language films